The following is a timeline of the history of Savannah, Georgia, United States.

18th century

 1733
 Savannah founded in British Colony of Georgia by James Oglethorpe.
 Ellis, Johnson, Percival, and St. James Squares laid out per Oglethorpe Plan.
 1734
Reynolds Square laid out.
Solomon's Lodge (Masonic lodge) founded.
 1735 – Congregation Mickve Israel formed.
 1739 – October 5: Creek leader Tomochichi died. He is buried in Percival Square.
 1740 – Bethesda Orphanage founded near town.
 1742 – Oglethorpe Square laid out.
 1750
 Colonial Park Cemetery established.
 Christ Church built.
 Savannah Female Asylum founded.
 1754
 Savannah becomes capital of British Province of Georgia.
 Pirates' House Inn in business.
 1755
 January 1: Georgia legislature convenes.
 Independent Presbyterian Church founded.
 1762 – Bonaventure Plantation established.
  – The Christian Camphor Cottage was built. It is believed to be the city's oldest extant structure.
 1765
Levi Sheftall Family Cemetery established.
Greenwich Plantation established.
 1771 – Habersham House completed.
 1773 – Mordecai Sheftall Cemetery established (possibly 1769).
 1775
 January: Provincial Congress held.
 June: Committee of Safety organized at the liberty pole.
1776 (or before) – The Eppinger House was built. It is believed to be the oldest extant brick structure in the city.
 1778
 December 29: Battle of Savannah; British in power.
 Georgia state capital relocated from Savannah to Augusta.
 1779 
Town Hall built.
Siege of Savannah.
 1782
 British occupation ends.
 Georgia state capital relocated to Savannah from Augusta.
 1786
 Georgia state capital relocated again from Savannah to Augusta.
 Chatham Artillery established.
 1788
 Town becomes part of the U.S. state of Georgia.
 African Baptist Church and Chatham Academy established.
 1789 – Savannah chartered as a city.
 1790
 John Houstoun becomes mayor.
 Franklin Square and Washington Square laid out
 1791 – Warren Square laid out.
 1796 – November 26: Fire.
 1799 – City Exchange constructed, replacing one that burned in 1796. Columbia Square and Greene Square laid out.

19th century
 1800 – Population: 5,146.
 1802 – Savannah Volunteer Guards established.
 1804
Seamen's Hospital opens.
Bonaventure Plantation destroyed by fire.
Lebanon Plantation established.
 1809 – Savannah Society Library founded.
 1810 – Population: 5,315.
 1812 – Hibernian Society organized.
 1813 – Oliver Sturges House built.
 1815 – Orleans Square and Chippewa Square laid out.
 1817 – Savannah Steamboat Company in business.
 1818
Telfair Academy built.
 The Savannah Theatre established.
 1819
 May: Steamboat Savannah travels to Liverpool, England.
 May: U.S. President Monroe visits town.
 William Scarbrough House (residence) built.
 Owens–Thomas House (residence built).
 1820
January: Fire.
Isaiah Davenport House built.
 1821 – The city's first hotel, City Hotel, is completed.
 1824 – Savannah Fire Company formed.
 1825 – March: Lafayette visits town.
 1830
Nathanael Greene Monument in Johnson Square completed.
Population: 7,303.
 1831 – Savannah–Ogeechee Canal constructed.
 1833 – First Baptist Church built.
 1834 – Oglethorpe Barracks built (approximate date).
 1837
Pulaski Square, Lafayette Square, Madison Square and Troup Square laid out.
Central of Georgia Railroad begins operating.
 1839 – Georgia Historical Society organized.
 1840
Sorrel–Weed House built.
Population: 11,214.
 1841 – Crawford Square laid out.
 1842 – Convent of St. Vincent de Paul founded.
 1844 – Savannah Institution for Savings instituted.
 1846 – Bonaventure Cemetery established near town.
 1847
Chatham Square and Monterey Square laid out.
Fort Pulaski built near town.
 1848
Customhouse built.
Population: 13,573.
 1850
 Daily Morning News begins publication.
1851
Calhoun Square and Whitefield Square laid out.
The Marshall House opens.
 1853
 Forsyth Place (park) laid out.
 Catholic Diocese of Savannah and Laurel Grove Cemetery established.
 St. John's Church consecrated.
Green–Meldrim House built.
Georgia State Railroad Museum built.
 1854
 Yellow fever outbreak.
 Central of Georgia Railway Company Shop Property built.
 Augusta and Savannah Railroad in operation (approximate date).
 1855 – Young Men's Literary Association organized.
 1858 – Old Harbor Light erected.
 1859
First African Baptist Church rebuilt.
 The Great Slave Auction at Ten Broeck Race Course, March 2 & 3.
 1860 – Central of Georgia Depot and Trainshed built.
 1861
 March 21: Cornerstone Speech by Alexander H. Stephens.
 Port blockaded by U.S. government.
 Green House (residence) built.
 1864 – December 22: Savannah taken by Union forces.
 1866 – City board of education incorporated.
 1867 – Beach Institute established.
 1868 – Mercer House (residence) built (approximate date).
 1870 – McCarthy's Business College established.
 1871 – Abend Zeitung newspaper begins publication.
 1873 – First Bryan Baptist Church rebuilt.
 1874 – Youth's Historical Society founded.
 1875
 Civil War Memorial in Forsyth Park dedicated.
 Colored Tribune newspaper begins publication.
 Savannah Rifle Association established.
 1876
 Cathedral of St. John the Baptist dedicated.
 Another yellow fever outbreak (see J. W. Schull)
 1878 – Congregation Mickve Israel synagogue built.
 1879 – City boundaries expanded.
 1880
 Confederate memorial built in Forsyth Park.
 Population: 30,709.
 1882 – Ford Dramatic Association incorporated.
 1883
City boundaries expanded.
William Washington Gordon Monument in Wright Square completed.
 1886 – Telfair Academy of Arts and Sciences opens.
 1887
Savannah Cotton Exchange building built.
Tybee-Savannah railway built.
 1888 – William Jasper Monument in Madison Square dedicated.
 1890 – Population: 43,189.
 1891 – Georgia Industrial College established.
 1893 – August: Sea Islands hurricane.
 1898 - Fire at the Cathedral of St. John the Baptist.
 1899
Kate Baldwin Free Kindergarten established.
Federal Building and U.S. Courthouse built.
 1900
Population: 54,244.
Great Dane Trailers founded as the Savannah Blowpipe Company

20th century

 1901
City boundaries expanded.
Hill Hall at Savannah State College built.
 1902
Benedictine College founded.
Savannah Union Station completed.
 1904 – City Exchange demolished.
 1906 – Savannah City Hall built.
 1908 – Savannah, Augusta and Northern Railway in operation (approximate date).
 1909 – December: Savannah axe murders
 1910
James Oglethorpe Monument in Chippewa Square dedicated.
Population: 65,064.
 1912 – Girl Guides of America founded.
1914 – East Henry Street Carnegie Library opens.
 1919
 Armstrong House completed.
April: Savannah Centennial Pageant performed.
 1920 – Population: 83,252.
 1921 – Lucas Theatre built
 1925 – Savannah Economic Development Authority established.
 1926 – Municipal Stadium built.
 1929
 WTOC radio begins broadcasting.
 Savannah Municipal Airport begins operating.
 Savannah Technical College established.
 1933 – Greenwich Cemetery established.
 1935
 Armstrong Junior College founded.
 Union Bag and Paper opens mill.
 1938 – Atlantic Greyhound Bus Terminal built.
 1939 – WSAV radio begins broadcasting.
 1940 – Coastal Transitional Center opened.
 1942 – U.S. Army Chatham Field (airfield) active.
 1950 – Little Theatre of Savannah founded.
 1951 – Palm Drive-In movie theatre opens.
 1953 – Talmadge Memorial Bridge built to Hutchinson Island.
 1954
 Council–manager form of government adopted.
 WTOC-TV (television) begins broadcasting.
 1955 – Historic Savannah Foundation organized.
 1956
 WSAV-TV (television) begins broadcasting.
 Juliette Gordon Low house museum opens.
 1960
 Travis Field airport terminal built.
 Population: 147,537.
 1962 – Savannah station built.
 1963 – Savannah Union Station demolished.
 1967 – Grumman Aircraft Engineering Co. opens Savannah office.
 1968
 The DeSoto Hotel opens.
Abercorn Plaza shopping centre opens for business.
 1969 – Oglethorpe Mall opens up for business.
 1970
 John Rousakis becomes mayor.
 Population: 118,349.
 1974 – Savannah Civic Center opens.
 1976 – Abercorn Cinema opens.
 1977 – City Records Committee established.
 1978 – Savannah College of Art and Design founded.
 1979 – September: Hurricane David makes landfall.
 1980
 Hyatt Regency Savannah opens.
 1981
Coastal State Prison built.
May 2: The shooting of Danny Hansford occurs at Mercer House, the basis of Midnight in the Garden of Good and Evil
 1986 – Chatham Area Transit established.
 1988 – Savannah Music Festival founded.
 1990
 Savannah Mall (the city's second shopping mall) in business.
 Talmadge Memorial Bridge rebuilt.
 1991
 Vietnam Veterans Memorial built in Emmet Park.
 Lady & Sons restaurant in business.
 1994
 Savannah/Hilton Head International Airport terminal built.
 Bestseller book about Savannah Midnight in the Garden of Good and Evil published.
 1998
 Savannah Arts Academy established.
 Floyd Adams becomes the first African American to become the Mayor of the City of Savannah.
 1999
 Georgia Tech Savannah established.
 City website online (approximate date).

21st century
 2000 – Lucas Theatre renovated.
 2002
African-American Monument on River Street dedicated.
Islamic Center of Savannah established.
 2004 – Otis Johnson becomes mayor.
 2005
 Abercorn Walk shopping center in business.
 Savannah-Chatham Metro Police established.
 2009 – The Savannah Philharmonic Orchestra is established.
 2010 – Population: 136,286.
 2012 
 Edna Jackson becomes mayor.
 Savannah Law School established.
 2016
 Eddie Deloach becomes mayor, first Republican since 1996.
 All of Savannah and Chatham county east of I95 was evacuated ahead of Hurricane Matthew.
 2017 – All of Savannah and Chatham County east of I95 evacuated due to the impact of Hurricane Irma.
 2018
Savannah Law School closed.
 City and county police merger ends, separating the two agencies.
Roy Minter sworn in as new police chief of Savannah Police Department.

See also
 History of Savannah, Georgia
 List of mayors of Savannah, Georgia
 Timelines of other cities in Georgia: Athens, Atlanta, Augusta, Columbus, Macon

References

Bibliography

Published in 18th–19th century 
 
 
 
 
 
 
 
 
 
 
 
 
 1881
 
 1884
 1896

Published in 20th century 
1900s–1950s
 
 
 
 
 
 
 
 
 

1950s–1990s
 Alexander A. Lawrence, A Present for Mr. Lincoln: The Story of Savannah from Secession to Sherman (Macon, Ga.: Ardivan Press, 1961).
 
 Preston Russell and Barbara Hines, Savannah: A History of Her People since 1733 (Savannah, Ga.: Frederic C. Beil, 1992).
 
 
 Whittington B. Johnson, Black Savannah, 1788-1864 (Fayetteville: University of Arkansas Press, 1996).
 Derek Smith, Civil War Savannah (Savannah, Ga.: Frederic C. Beil, 1997).
 Patrick Allen, ed., Literary Savannah (Athens, Ga.: Hill Street Press, 1998).

Published in 21st century 
 Mills B. Lane, Savannah Revisited: History and Architecture, 5th ed. (Savannah, Ga.: Beehive Press, 2001).
 
 Walter J. Fraser Jr., Savannah in the Old South (Athens: University of Georgia Press, 2003).
 
 Jacqueline Jones, Saving Savannah: The City and the Civil War (New York: Knopf, 2008).

External links

 
 University of Texas, Perry–Castañeda Library Map Collection. Maps of Savannah, various dates
 Items related to Savannah, various dates (via Digital Public Library of America)

Years in Georgia (U.S. state)
 
savannah